Ancistrocrania is an extinct genus of brachiopods from the Upper Cretaceous of Europe and North-America. The name is derived from the Greek words αγκιστρο (agkistro) "fish hook" and κρανίον (kranion) skull.

References 

 Fossils (Smithsonian Handbooks) by David Ward (Page 92)

External links
Ancistrocrania in the Paleobiology Database

Prehistoric brachiopod genera
Cretaceous brachiopods
Cretaceous animals of Europe
Craniata